What Will We Be is Devendra Banhart's seventh studio album released on October 27, 2009, on Warner Bros. Records. The album was co-produced by Banhart and Paul Butler from A Band of Bees. Rejoining Banhart are old band mates Noah Georgeson, Greg Rogove, Luckey Remington, and Rodrigo Amarante, all of whom worked with him on his previous album, Smokey Rolls Down Thunder Canyon.

The composition "Maria Lionza" is an "evocation to the goddess."

Track listing

Chart performance

Album charts

References

2009 albums
Devendra Banhart albums